Terbium(III) nitrate is an inorganic chemical compound, a salt of terbium and nitric acid, with the formula . The hexahydrate crystallizes as triclinic colorless crystals with the formula . It can be used to synthesize materials with green emission.

Preparation
Terbium(III) nitrate can be prepared by dissolving terbium(III,IV) oxide in a mixture of aqueous  and  solution.

Terbium(III) nitrate can be obtained by reacting terbium(III) oxide with nitric acid and crystallizing then drying the crystals with 45~55% sulfuric acid to obtain the hexahydrate.

Properties

References

Terbium compounds
Nitrates